Bendougouba  is a village and commune in the Cercle of Kita in the Kayes Region of south-western Mali. The commune includes 17 villages and in the 2009 census had a population 10,752.

References

External links
.

Communes of Kayes Region